Reginald William "Reg" Webb (17 May 1947 – 28 January 2018) was an English musician and singer-songwriter. He achieved success not only with his own band Fusion (which later became The Reg Webb Band and featured a young Nik Kershaw, Kenn Elson and Alan Clarke), but also touring with Lenny Kravitz, The Outfield, Suzi Quatro, Vanessa Paradis and others. He was also part of a duo called Short People.

Webb predominantly played keyboards and was a vocalist.

Personal life
Webb was born in Chelmsford, Essex, England. He became blind at the age of 13 months after being diagnosed with bi-lateral retinoblastoma which resulted in surgery to remove both of his eyes. Reg Webb died on 28 January 2018 from pulmonary embolism, a consequence of metastatic bladder cancer; he was 70.

References

1947 births
2018 deaths
people from Chelmsford
Deaths from pulmonary embolism
The Outfield members
English male singer-songwriters
English keyboardists
Blind musicians
Musicians from Essex
Deaths from bladder cancer
Deaths from cancer in the United Kingdom